Danylivka is a rural settlement in the Yalta Municipality of the Autonomous Republic of Crimea, a territory recognized by a majority of countries as part of Ukraine and annexed by Russia as the Republic of Crimea.

In 1928, the settlement was known as the Ay Danil sovkhoz (probably from medieval Greek Άη Δανιήλ, Ai-Daniyl, Saint Daniel), belonging to the Hurzuf Settlement Council of the Yalta Raion. Following the forced deportation of the Crimean Tatars in 1944, the Presidium of the Supreme Soviet of the Russian SFSR published a decree on May 18, 1948 renaming the settlement along with many others throughout Crimea from their native Crimean Tatar names to their current variants.

Its population was 474 in the 2001 Ukrainian census. Current population:

References

Rural settlements in Crimea
Yalta Municipality